Zhu Rui (born 23 April 1998) is a Chinese ice hockey player and member of the Chinese national ice hockey team, currently playing in the Zhenskaya Hockey League (ZhHL) with the KRS Vanke Rays. She previously played in the Canadian Women's Hockey League (CWHL) with Kunlun Red Star WIH in the 2017–18 season and the Shenzhen KRS Vanke Rays in the 2018–19 season.

Zhu represented China in the women's ice hockey tournament at the 2022 Winter Olympics in Beijing.

Career statistics

International

Note: Statistics from Olympic qualification tournaments not included in career totals

References

External links
 
 

1998 births
Living people
Asian Games medalists in ice hockey
Asian Games silver medalists for China
Chinese women's ice hockey defencemen
Ice hockey players at the 2017 Asian Winter Games
Ice hockey players at the 2022 Winter Olympics 
Medalists at the 2017 Asian Winter Games
Olympic ice hockey players of China
Shenzhen KRS Vanke Rays players
Sportspeople from Harbin